China Airlines Flight 006 (callsign "Dynasty 006") was a daily non-stop flight from Taipei to Los Angeles International Airport. The plane rolled over and plunged , experiencing high speeds and g-forces (as high as 5g) before the captain was able to recover from the dive, and then to divert to San Francisco International Airport.

Accident

The aircraft had departed from Taipei at 16:22 China Standard Time. The accident occurred 10 hours into the flight. The cockpit crew consisted of Captain Min-Yuan Ho, age 55; First Officer Ju-Yue Chang, age 53; Flight Engineer Kuo-Pin Wei, age 55; Relief Captain Chien-Yuan Liao, age 53; and Relief Flight Engineer Shih-Lung Su, age 41. The captain had approximately 15,500 flight hours, including 3,748 hours on the Boeing 747. The first officer had more than 7,700 hours with 4,553 of them on the Boeing 747, and the flight engineer had approximately 15,500 hours of flight time, including 4,363 hours on the Boeing 747. The accident occurred while the main crew was on duty.

The sequence began with a loss of thrust in the No. 4 engine. That engine had failed twice during previous flights (while cruising at FL 410 and 430). In each of those cases the engine was restarted after descending to a lower altitude. The maintenance response to the logbook entries that noted the attempted solutions included engine inspection; fuel filter drainage and replacement; vane controller inspection and replacement; water drainage from Mach probes; and other filter replacements. None of those acts fixed the recurrent problem with the No. 4 engine.

The flight engineer attempted to restore power to the engine but did not close the bleed valve as required by the checklist procedure. According to the flight manual, engine restart is unlikely to succeed above .

Meanwhile, as the airspeed decreased the autopilot rolled the control wheel to the maximum left limit of 23 degrees while maintaining level flight. As the speed decreased even further the aircraft began to roll to the right even though the autopilot was maintaining the maximum left roll limit. By the time the captain disconnected the autopilot the aircraft had rolled over 60 degrees to the right and the nose had begun to drop. Ailerons and flight spoilers were the only means available to the autopilot to keep the wings level as the autopilot does not connect to the rudder during normal flight. To counteract the asymmetrical forces created by the loss of thrust from the No. 4 engine, it was essential for the pilot to manually use the left floor pedal to push the rudder to the left. However, the captain failed to use any rudder inputs at all, before or after disconnecting the autopilot.

As the aircraft descended through clouds, the captain's attention was drawn to the attitude indicator, which displayed excessive bank and pitch indications. Because such an attitude is highly irregular, the captain incorrectly assumed the indicators to be faulty. Without any visual reference because of cloud cover and having rejected the information from the attitude indicators, the captain and first officer became spatially disoriented.

The aircraft had descended  in under two-and-a-half minutes, while all onboard experienced g-forces as high as 5 g. At that point, the crew believed that all four engines had flamed out, but the National Transportation Safety Board found that only engine No. 4 had failed.

After leveling out, the three remaining engines continued supplying normal thrust. Another restart attempt brought engine No. 4 back into use. The aircraft began climbing. The crew reported "condition normal now" to air traffic control, along with the intention of continuing on to Los Angeles. They then noticed that the inboard main landing gear was down and one of the hydraulic systems was empty. With the drag added by the deployed landing gear the aircraft had insufficient fuel to reach Los Angeles. An emergency was declared and the aircraft diverted to San Francisco International Airport.

Aftermath
There were two serious injuries on board: a fracture and laceration of a foot, and an acute back strain requiring two days of hospitalization. The aircraft was significantly damaged by the excessive G-forces. Most affected was the tail, where large outer parts of the horizontal stabilizer had been ripped off. The entire left outboard elevator had been lost along with its actuator, which had been powered by the hydraulic system that ruptured and drained.

After repairs were made to the plane, it returned to flight status on 25 April 1985. It continued in service for nearly 12 years until it was leased to China Airlines' sister company, Mandarin Airlines, in January 1997, and was in daily service for the remainder of that year before it was withdrawn from service and placed in a boneyard in Nevada. In April 2002, the aircraft was acquired by Indian evangelist and humanitarian K.A. Paul, and dubbed "Global Peace One." Beginning in February 2004, the aircraft was used to deliver disaster aid to countries such as Ethiopia, India, Iran, and Jordan; however, by July 2005 the FAA had revoked Global Peace Ambassadors' operating certificate due to poor maintenance of the aircraft, effectively grounding it at Thunder Bay International Airport in Ontario, Canada. In December 2005, a ferry permit was issued and N4522V was flown to Tijuana International Airport, where the aircraft remained parked as of 2020 with the possibility of it being scrapped.

In its final report, the US NTSB stated "The Safety Board can only conclude that the captain was distracted first by the evaluation of the engine malfunction and second by his attempts to arrest the decreasing airspeed, and that, because of these distractions, he was unable to assess properly and promptly the approaching loss of airplane control. The Safety Board also concludes that the captain over-relied on the autopilot and that this was also causal to the accident since the autopilot effectively masked the approaching onset of the loss of control of the airplane."  The NTSB report ended with No Recommendations intended to prevent similar problems in the future.

China Airlines continued operating one of its scheduled Taipei–Los Angeles services as Dynasty 006 until 2018, utilizing the Boeing 747-400 until late 2014, when the Boeing 777-300ER replaced it. In March 2018, due to fleet shortage and financial stress, the flight number was retired and replaced by flight 008; however, the use of flight number 006 was resumed in June 2019 after the increased requirement of more Taipei–Los Angeles flights.

In popular culture
The Discovery Channel Canada / National Geographic TV series Mayday (also called Air Crash Investigation or Air Emergency) dramatized the accident in a 2007 episode titled Panic Over the Pacific.
The flight was documented on an episode of the Weather Channel television program Why Planes Crash titled "Who's Flying".

References

External links
Accident Brief by the U.S. National Transportation Safety Board.
Full Accident Report by the U.S. National Transportation Safety Board. 
(Alternate report courtesy of University of Bielefeld – Faculty of technology html version by Hiroshi Sogame Safety Promotion Comt. All Nippon Airways)
Summary and comments in Risks Digest.
Wilentz, Amy (4 March 1985). "Diving From the Heavens". Time.
German article with pictures of the damaged airplane after landing in Der Spiegel

Accidents and incidents involving the Boeing 747
Airliner accidents and incidents caused by pilot error
Aviation accidents and incidents in 1985
006
1985 in California
Aviation accidents and incidents in California
February 1985 events in Asia
Airliner accidents and incidents caused by engine failure